Roland Berland (born 26 February 1945) is a French former racing cyclist. He won the French national road race title in 1972 and 1979.

Major results

1966
 4th Overall 
1st Stage 2
1969
 5th Critérium National de la Route
1970
 3rd Critérium National de la Route
 9th Overall Tour of the Basque Country
1st Stage 1
1971
 3rd Züri-Metzgete
 3rd Overall Tour de l'Oise
1972
 1st  Road race, National Road Championships
 4th Paris–Bourges
 5th Rund um den Henninger Turm
1973
 1st Paris–Bourges
1974
 9th Critérium National de la Route
1977
 1st Stage 1b 
 3rd Critérium National de la Route
 3rd GP Ouest–France
1978
 1st Stage 2 Tour de Corse
 8th Critérium National de la Route
 10th GP Ouest–France
1979
 1st  Road race, National Road Championships
 8th GP de la Ville de Rennes
1980
 2nd Bordeaux–Paris

Grand Tour general classification results timeline

References

External links
 

1945 births
Living people
French male cyclists
Sportspeople from Vendée
Cyclists from Pays de la Loire